DNA (cytosine-5)-methyltransferase 1 is an enzyme that catalyzes the transfer of methyl groups to specific CpG structures in DNA, a process called DNA methylation. In humans, it is encoded by the DNMT1 gene. DNMT1 forms part of the family of DNA methyltransferase enzymes, which consists primarily of DNMT1, DNMT3A, and DNMT3B.

Function 

This enzyme is responsible for maintaining DNA methylation, which ensures the fidelity of this epigenetic patterns across cell divisions. In line with this role, it has a strong preference towards methylating CpGs on hemimethylated DNA. However, Dnmt1 can catalyze de novo DNA methylation in specific genomic contexts, including transposable elements and paternal imprint control regions. Aberrant methylation patterns are associated with certain human tumors and developmental abnormalities.

See also 
 DNA methyltransferase

Interactions 
DNMT1 has been shown to interact with UHRF1,:
 DMAP1, 
 DNMT3A 
 DNMT3B,
 HDAC2, 
 PCNA,
 RB1. and
 G9A
DNMT1 is highly transcribed during the S phase of the cell cycle when it is required for methylation of the newly generated hemimethylated sites on daughter DNA strands. Its interaction with PCNA and UHRF1 has been implicated in localizing it to the replication fork. The direct co-operation between DNMT1 and G9a coordinates DNA and H3K9 methylation during cell division. This chromatin methylation is necessary for stable repression of gene expression during mammalian development.

Model organisms 
Knockout experiments have shown that this enzyme is responsible for the bulk of methylation in mouse cells, and it is essential for embryonic development. It has also been shown that a lack of both maternal and zygotic Dnmt1 results in complete demethylation of imprinted genes in blastocysts.

Clinical significance 
DNMT1 plays a critical role in Hematopoietic stem cell (HSC) maintenance. HSCs with reduced DNMT1 fail to self-renew efficiently post-transplantation. It has also been shown to be critical for other stem cell types such as Intestinal stem cells (ISCs) and Mammary stem cells (MaSCs). Conditional deletion of DNMT1 results in overall intestinal hypomethylation, crypt expansion and altered differentiation timing of ISCs, and proliferation and maintenance of MaSCs.

References

Further reading

External links 
  GeneReviews/NCBI/NIH/UW entry on DNMT1-Related Dementia, Deafness, and Sensory Neuropathy